Jasmine Ng Kin Kia (born 1972) is a Singaporean director known for co-directing the feature film Eating Air with Kelvin Tong, the documentary film Pink Paddlers and the short film Moveable Feast, which she co-directed alongside Tong and Sandi Tan. She is also a part-time film lecturer at the National University of Singapore.

Early life and education
While Ng was studying at Singapore Chinese Girls' School, she filmed her own rendition of Swan Lake with the "odd-sized girls" in her class, which she titled Duck Pond. She studied at Victoria Junior College. In 1991, she won a scholarship to study at New York University Tisch School of the Arts, jointly offered by the Economic Development Board and VHQ, becoming the first person to win the scholarship. In the summer of 1992, she and her friends Sandi Tan and Sophia Siddique decided to make a film. They would use their savings to make the film, and would be guided by Georges Cardona, who was their mentor and close friend. The film, Shirkers, starring Tan as a serial killer named "S", was edited by Ng, produced by Siddique and directed by Cardona. However, before the film could be completed, Cardona disappeared with the film.

Career
In 1996, Ng, Tan and filmmaker Kelvin Tong filmed the 14-minute short film Moveable Feast which won the Best Short Film Award at the 1996 Singapore International Film Festival, and played at various other film festivals. By then, she had also become a film and video editor at VHQ. She co-directed the romantic action film Eating Air with Tong in 1999. The film was the acting debut of Benjamin Heng, who starred in the film, and the feature debut of Michelle Chong, who had a supporting role. The film won the Young Cinema Award at the 2000 Singapore International Film Festival and was screened at various other film festivals, later becoming a cult film.

In 2007, she filmed the documentary film Pink Paddlers, which follows members of the dragonboat team of the Breast Cancer Society getting ready for the Breast Cancer Survivors DragonBoat World Championship. The film received support with a grant from the Khoo Teck Puat Foundation and raised funds for Breast Cancer Foundation Singapore, Unifem and SCWO Star Shelter. She served as a Board Member of the Singapore International Film Festival in 2009. She has also directed several television commercials, and held film workshops and mentorship programmes.

She was an interviewee in Sandi Tan's 2018 documentary film on the development and the disappearance of Shirkers as well as George Cardona. By then, she had also become a part-time film lecturer at the National University of Singapore, and had taught in the LASALLE College of the Arts and various polytechnics and primary schools.

Filmography
 Moveable Feast (1996; co-directed with Sandi Tan and Kelvin Tong)
 Eating Air (1999; co-directed with Kelvin Tong)
 Pink Paddlers (2007)

References

1972 births
Singaporean film directors
Singaporean women film directors
Living people